Articles relating to Nunavut include:

0-9 

 .nt.ca

A 

 Airports in Nunavut
 Airlines in Nunavut

B

C 

 Coat of arms of Nunavut
 Climate of Nunavut
 Culture of Nunavut
 Communities in Nunavut

D 

 Demographics of Nunavut

E 

 Economy of Nunavut
 Executive Council of Nunavut

F

G

H

I

J

K

L

M

N

O

P

Q

R

S

T

U

V

W

X

Y

Z 

Nunavut
Indexes of topics by Canadian province